Gaap (also Tap, Coap, Taob, Goap) is a demon that is described in demonological grimoires such as the Lesser Key of Solomon, Johann Weyer's Pseudomonarchia Daemonum, and the Munich Manual of Demonic Magic, as well as Jacques Collin de Plancy's Dictionnaire Infernal,

These works describe Gaap as a prince in human form who incites love. The Munich Manual also says that "Taob" also provides medical care for women, transforms them to make it easier to get to a lover, renders them infertile, and rules twenty-five legions of spirits.  The other sources instead describe Gaap as a president, giving him the power to teach philosophy and liberal arts, make others invisible, steal familiars from other magicians, make men stupid, and carry men between kingdoms; in addition to ruling sixty-six legions of demons.  Johann Weyer also connects Gaap to necromancers, and states that he was first called upon by Noah's son Ham, along with Beleth.  He was of the order of potestates.

Gaap (or Goap) is also one of the four cardinal spirits, of the south in the Lesser Key of Solomon, the west in the Pseudomonarchia Daemonum.

In the Livre des Esperitz, Gaap (as Caap) is still a prince, but appears as a knight, brings gold and silver anywhere, and rules twenty legions of spirits.

Accomplished occultist Carroll "Poke" Runyon treats Gaap and Coap as different entities, although they were historically the same figure.

According to Thomas Rudd, Gaap is opposed by the Shemhamphorasch angel Ieuiah.

See also
 Amaymon is also one of the four cardinal spirits, of the east in the Lesser Key of Solomon.
 Ziminiar is also one of the four cardinal spirits, of the north in the Lesser Key of Solomon.
 Corson is also one of the four cardinal spirits, of the west in the Lesser Key of Solomon.

References

Goetic demons